Jamel Saihi  (born 27 January 1987) is a French-born Tunisian professional footballer who plays as a defensive midfielder. He previously spent 16 years at Montpellier, with whom he won the 2011-12 Ligue 1 title.

International goals

References

External links

1987 births
Living people
Tunisian footballers
Tunisia international footballers
Montpellier HSC players
Angers SCO players
Ligue 1 players
Ligue 2 players
Association football midfielders
Tunisian people of Algerian descent
French sportspeople of Tunisian descent
2012 Africa Cup of Nations players
2015 Africa Cup of Nations players